New Jersey's 37th Legislative District is one of 40 in the state, covering the Bergen County municipalities of Alpine, Bogota, Cresskill, Englewood, Englewood Cliffs, Fort Lee, Hackensack, Leonia, Northvale, Palisades Park, Rockleigh, Teaneck and Tenafly. As of the 2020 United States census, the district had a population of 231,985.

Demographic characteristics
As of the 2020 United States census, the district had a population of 231,985, of whom 184,858 (79.7%) were of voting age. The racial makeup of the district was 88,331 (38.1%) White, 30,788 (13.3%) African American, 1,547 (0.7%) Native American, 57,714 (24.9%) Asian, 82 (0.0%) Pacific Islander, 30,166 (13.0%) from some other race, and 23,357 (10.1%) from two or more races. Hispanic or Latino of any race were 56,951 (24.5%) of the population.

The district had 157,713 registered voters as of December 1, 2021, of whom 55,363 (35.1%) were registered as unaffiliated, 78,021 (49.5%) were registered as Democrats, 22,724 (14.4%) were registered as Republicans, and 1,605 (1.0%) were registered to other parties.

African-American residents account for 16.6% of the district's population, mostly in Englewood, Hackensack, and Teaneck. The 37th has the fourth-highest percentage of Asian residents of all districts statewide, accounting for 13.4% of the population.

Political representation
For the 2022–2023 session, the district is represented in the New Jersey Senate by Gordon M. Johnson (D, Englewood) and in the General Assembly by Shama Haider (D, Tenafly) and Ellen Park (D, Englewood Cliffs).

The legislative district overlaps with New Jersey's 5th and 9th congressional districts.

District composition since 1973
The 37th District was created in 1973 along with the 40-district statewide legislative map. Some municipalities in the district in the 1970s included  Bergenfield, Edgewater, Englewood, Fort Lee, Teaneck and Tenafly. After the 1981 redistricting, the only change made to the district was the addition of Fairview. In the 1991 redistricting, some of the towns at the southern end of the district as well as Tenafly and Englewood Cliffs were shifted to other districts while it expanded west to Ridgefield Park, Bogota, Hackensack, and Maywood. Changes made as a result of the 2001 redistricting including the reinstatement of Palisades Park, Tenafly, and Englewood Cliffs and the addition of Rochelle Park but Fort Lee was removed from the district at this time.

In the 2011 apportionment following the 2010 Census, Bergenfield, Maywood, and Rochelle Park (to District 38), Ridgefield Park (to District 36) were removed and Alpine, Cresskill, Fort Lee, Northvale and Rockleigh were added.

As of 2010, registered Democrats outnumber Republicans by a 2-1 ratio in the district. The 37th has never elected any legislators other than Democrats; one of only nine districts statewide to have only sent members of one political party to Trenton.

Loretta Weinberg was chosen by Democratic committee members in March 1992 to fill the seat vacated in the Assembly by D. Bennett Mazur, who had resigned due to illness.

In February 1993, Byron Baer announced that he would run for the seat in the New Jersey State Senate being vacated by Matthew Feldman. Together with Assembly running mates Weinberg and Ken Zisa, who was on the ballot for Baer's former Assembly seat, Baer won election to the Senate.

The Bergen County Democratic Organization caucused in September 2005, to select a candidate to replace Baer in the Senate who resigned on September 8, 2005 due to health issues. In balloting to replace Baer on an interim basis, Weinberg lost by a 114-110 margin to Zisa. In a separate vote, by a 112-111 margin, Zisa was selected over Weinberg to be the party's candidate on the November ballot.  Weinberg filed suit to challenger the exclusion of five ballots and in October 2005 a ruling in Weinberg's favor was issued, giving Weinberg the interim position and the ballot post. With Weinberg's victory, Bergen County Freeholder Valerie Huttle and Englewood Mayor Michael Wildes both announced their candidacy for Weinberg's Assembly seat, with Huttle outpolling Wildes in another special convention by a 121-96 margin.

Election history
Senators and Assembly members elected from the district are as follows:

Election results

Senate

General Assembly

References

Bergen County, New Jersey
37